Robert Nowotny (born January 27, 1974, in Vienna) is an Austrian beach volleyball player.

Nowotny began his career at the FIVB World Tour in 1996. From the 2000 season went on to compete with your long-time partner, Peter Gartmayer, where they remained until 2005. In 2004 Gartmayer/Nowotny obtained the qualification for the 2004 Summer Olympics, in Athens, but they lost all their games in the group stage and did not advance to the medal round.

References

External links
 
 
 

1974 births
Living people
Austrian beach volleyball players
Austrian people of Czech descent
Olympic beach volleyball players of Austria
Beach volleyball players at the 2004 Summer Olympics
Sportspeople from Vienna
Men's beach volleyball players